__noTOC__
Sandy Lake may refer to:

First Nations
 Sandy Lake Band of Mississippi Chippewa, Native American tribe in Minnesota, United States
 Sandy Lake Tragedy, the culmination in 1850 of a series of events centered in Sandy Lake, Minnesota
 Sandy Lake First Nation, independent Oji-Cree First Nation in Ontario, Canada
 Sandy Lake, Minnesota, Native American settlement

Places

Lakes

Canada 
 Sandy Lake (Alberta)
 Sandy Lake, County of Two Hills No. 21, Alberta
 Sandy Lake, Lac Ste. Anne County, Alberta
 Sandy Lake, Municipal District of Opportunity No. 17, Alberta
 Sandy Lake, Bowron Lake Provincial Park, British Columbia
 Sandy Lake, Manitoba
 Sandy Lake, Nova Scotia
 Sandy Lake (Ontario)
 Sandy Lake, Saskatchewan
 Sandy Lake (Severn River)
 Sandy Lake (Trent Lakes)

United States 
 Sandy Lake, Alaska Peninsula National Wildlife Refuge, Alaska
 Sandy Lake, Louisiana
 Big Sandy Lake, Minnesota
 Sandy Lake, Alaska

Settlements

Canada 
 Sandy Lake, Alberta
 Sandy Lake, Manitoba
 Sandy Lake, Ontario
 Sandy Lake Airport, located adjacent to Sandy Lake, Ontario, Canada
 Sandy Lake Water Aerodrome, located on Sandy Lake, adjacent to the Sandy Lake First Nation, Ontario, Canada

United States 
 Sandy Lake, Louisiana
 Sandy Lake Indian Reservation, Minnesota
Sandy Lake, Minnesota
 Sandy Lake, Pennsylvania
 Sandy Lake Township, Mercer County, Pennsylvania

See also
 Sandylake, a hamlet in Cornwall, England